Willard Arnold Johnson (August 28, 1862 – May 5, 1923) was an American politician. He served as lieutenant governor of Texas and as a member for the 29th district of the Texas Senate.

Life and career 
Johnson attended the University of Texas studying political science and journalism.

In 1911, Johnson was elected to represent 29th district of the Texas Senate, serving until 1919, when Johnson was elected to the Texas lieutenant governorship, serving under Governor William P. Hobby. He served until 1921, when he was succeeded by Lynch Davidson.

Johnson died in May 1923, at the age of 60.

References 

1862 births
1923 deaths
Democratic Party Texas state senators
20th-century American politicians
Lieutenant Governors of Texas
University of Texas alumni